ITUR (Italy - Turkey - Ukraine - Russia) is a submarine communications cable system linking the aforementioned countries.

It has landing points in:
Palermo, Sicily, Italy
Istanbul, Turkey
Odesa, Ukraine
Novorossiysk, Russia

References

  
 https://web.archive.org/web/20070930122255/http://foptnet.ge/map2eng.htm Map of the cable system (3 Systems BSFOCS, KAFOS, & ITUR)

Submarine communications cables in the Black Sea
Submarine communications cables in the Mediterranean Sea
Russia–Ukraine relations
Russia–Turkey relations
Italy–Russia relations
Italy–Turkey relations